Laurie Slade Funderburk (born March 31, 1975) is a former Democratic member of the South Carolina House of Representatives, serving from 2005 to 2020. Funderburk has also served as a clerk for the South Carolina Senate Judiciary Committee.

References

External links
 
Legislative page

1975 births
Living people
Democratic Party members of the South Carolina House of Representatives
People from Camden, South Carolina
University of South Carolina alumni
Women state legislators in South Carolina
21st-century American politicians
21st-century American women politicians